A penile fibula is foremost a ring, attached with a pin through the foreskin to fasten it above the glans penis. It was mainly used by ancient Roman culture, though it may have originated earlier. This ring type of fibula has been described akin to a "large modern safety pin". Its usage may have had several reasons, for example to avoid intercourse, to promote modesty or the belief that it helped preserve a man's voice. Some Jews also utilized fibulas to hide that they were circumcised. The word fibula could also be used in general in Rome to denote any type of covering of the penis (such as with a sheath) for the sake of voice preservation or sexual abstinence, it was often used by masters on their slaves for this purpose. Fibulas were frequent subject of ridicule among satirists in Rome.

Infibulation could be also a surgical procedure in which two holes were pierced in the foreskin, so a metal clasp could be locked on them to close the prepuce shut. This procedure was similarly criticized by Celsus.

See also
 Boxer at Rest, a Hellenistic Greek sculpture showing infibulation
 Kynodesme
 Koteka, a type of penis sheath

References

Human penis
Human voice
Jews and Judaism in the Roman Empire
Male genital modification
Penis piercings
Sexual abstinence
Sexuality in ancient Rome